Prince Jari (Hangul: 자리군, Hanja: 資利君) was a Korean Royal Prince as the youngest son of Taejo of Goryeo and Lady Seongmu of the Pyeongsan Bak clan. His religion was Buddhism. He died too early at the young age since Ja-ri (자리, 資利) mean was the youngest son, so it seems that he was the youngest son of Taejo among his 25 sons.

References

Korean princes
Year of birth unknown
Year of death unknown
10th-century Korean people